George Offor (1787– 7 August 1864) was an English book-collector who accumulated a massive personal library.

Offor entered business as a bookseller at Tower Hill, London. He studied Hebrew, Greek and Latin and became an expert in sixteenth- and seventeenth-century English literature and theological writings.

Works

John Bunyan

He had compiled the complete works of John Bunyan. However some of them were destroyed in a fire.

He spent his days reading, researching, recording, comparing, and editing the works of  Bunyan. Offor's diligent labour concluded in 1854 with the printing of the three-volume, 2,800 page Works of John Bunyan. Now over a century and a half old, Offor's final product remains the most popular definitive collection of Bunyan in print.

Auction

After his death, his huge collection of books was to be auctioned on 27 June 1865, for 11 days by Sotheby's.  However, on 29 June, a fire consumed nearly all the items that were for sale.

Bibliography

References

External links
 Dictionary of National Biography
 
 

 

1787 births
1864 deaths
English book and manuscript collectors
English booksellers
19th-century British businesspeople